Lupino, or Luppino, is a surname of Italian origin, meaning little wolf, which is derived from the Latin lupus.

The name may refer to:
The Lupino family of British and American actors:
Ida Lupino (1918–1995), Anglo-American film actress and director
Lupino Lane (Henry William George Lupino) (1892–1959), British actor
Richard Lupino (1929–2005), American actor
Stanley Lupino (1893–1942), English actor, dancer, and author; father of Ida Lupino
Wallace Lupino (1898–1961), British film actor
Nathalie Lupino (born 1963), French judoka
Carmine Luppino (born 1948), Italian gymnast
The Luppino crime family, an Italian-Canadian crime family

Surnames of Italian origin
Italian-language surnames